Munona is a genus of moths in the family Erebidae described by Schaus in 1894.

Species
Munona iridescens Schaus, 1894 Venezuela, Peru, Brazil, Ecuador
Munona carolinepalmerae Espinoza, 2017 Costa Rica
Munona robpuschendorfi Espinoza, 2017 Costa Rica

Former species
Munona haxairei

References

External links

Phaegopterina
Moth genera